The German Volleyball Association ( DVV ) or in ( German : Deutscher Volleyball-Verband ) is the governing body for volleyball in the Federal Republic of Germany. The DVV is a member of the International Volleyball Federation (FIVB), the European Volleyball Confederation (CEV) and it is associated with the German Olympic Sports Confederation (DOSB).
It has an active 7,009   sport societies, as well it has an active 408,863 registered members.

It organizes the men's  and women's volleyball championships in Germany as well it manages and organizes all the activities of the men's  and women's national teams from seniors to under-age categories.
DVV also is responsible for all activities in Beach Volleyball in Germany.

References

External links
 Official Website 
 DVV at FIVB.com

Volleyball in Germany
Germany
Volleyball